Robert Joseph Mettle-Nunoo also known as Rojo Mettle Nunoo is Ghanaian contemporary artist and politician. He is a member of the National Democratic Congress and served as the Deputy Minister of Health during the John Evans Atta Mills government.

Education 
Mettle-Nunoo has a Bachelor of Arts degree in arts (painting and sculpture) from Kwame Nkrumah University of Science and Technology.

Politics 
In January 2009, Mettle-Nunoo was appointed as Deputy Minister for Roads and Highways by President John Evans Atta Mills. After a reshuffle of ministers, he was moved to the serve as deputy minister of Health. He was the campaign manager of John Atta Mills in the 2008 December.

References 

Living people
National Democratic Congress (Ghana) politicians
Government ministers of Ghana
Kwame Nkrumah University of Science and Technology alumni
Ghanaian artists
Year of birth missing (living people)